The 2017–18 Metal Ligaen season was the 61st season of ice hockey in Denmark. The season got extended from 10 to 11 teams by including Hvidovre Fighters. It is Hvidovre's first season in the league since the 2012–13 season. It is also the first time ever that the league consists of 11 teams.

Teams 

Teams licensed to play in the Metal Ligaen 2017–18

Regular season

Play-offs 

g.The score for third place is goals, not games.

References

External links
 Metal Ligaen official website

2017 in Danish sport
2018 in Danish sport
2017–18 in European ice hockey leagues
Seasons in Superisligaen